Stuart Glascott (born 6 June 1965) is a former Australian rules footballer who played with the Brisbane Bears in the Victorian Football League (VFL).

Glascott, the younger brother of Carlton premiership winner David, was originally from Victoria but joined the Bears from Southport.

He appeared in the final four rounds of the 1987 VFL season.

References

External links
 
 

1965 births
Australian rules footballers from Victoria (Australia)
Brisbane Bears players
Southport Australian Football Club players
Living people